Aaron Payne (born May 16, 1971) is an American former sprinter.

References

1971 births
Living people
American male sprinters
Universiade medalists in athletics (track and field)
Place of birth missing (living people)
Universiade gold medalists for the United States
Medalists at the 1993 Summer Universiade
20th-century American people